Adem Büyük (born 30 August 1987) is a Turkish professional footballer who plays primarily as a striker but also as a left winger for Manisa. He is a former international for Turkey, also earning caps with the U-18 and U-21 squads.

Club career
Büyük started his career with local club Artvin Hopaspor. He spent a year at Arhavispor before Beşiktaş transferred him in 2003. Büyük did not make any appearances for the club, spending his time on loan at Zeytinburnuspor, Akçaabat Sebatspor, and Altay. Manisaspor transferred him in 2008, and he spent the second half of 2010–10 season on loan at Mersin İdmanyurdu.

On 28 June 2019, Adem signed a two-year deal on a free transfer to Galatasaray.

International career
On 15 November 2013, Büyük played his first national match for Turkey against Northern Ireland in Adana.

Managerial career
He was appointed a player–coach at Yeni Malatyaspor on 7 February 2022, after Marius Șumudică left the team the same day. On 25 February he left the club.

Honours
Galatasaray
Süper Kupa (1): 2019

Individual
U21 Ligi Top Scorer: 2004–05 (26 goals)

References

External links
 
 

1987 births
People from Hopa
Living people
Turkish footballers
Turkey youth international footballers
Turkey under-21 international footballers
Turkey B international footballers
Turkey international footballers
Association football forwards
Beşiktaş J.K. footballers
Zeytinburnuspor footballers
Akçaabat Sebatspor footballers
Altay S.K. footballers
Manisaspor footballers
Boluspor footballers
Mersin İdman Yurdu footballers
Kasımpaşa S.K. footballers
Yeni Malatyaspor footballers
Galatasaray S.K. footballers
Manisa FK footballers
Süper Lig players
TFF First League players
Turkish football managers
Yeni Malatyaspor managers